This is a list of world records in Olympic weightlifting. These records are maintained in each weight class for the snatch lift, clean and jerk lift, and the total for both lifts.

The International Weightlifting Federation (IWF) restructured its weight classes in 1993, 1998 and 2018, nullifying earlier records.

Current records
Key to tables:

When the previous records and weight classes were discarded, the IWF defined "world standards" as the minimum lifts needed to qualify as world records in the new weight classes.
Wherever World Standard appears in the list below, no qualified weightlifter has yet lifted these weights in a sanctioned competition.

Men

Women

Historical records

Men (1998–2018)

Men (1993–1997)

Men (1973–1992)

Men (1920–1972)

Women (1998–2018)

 On the website of the International Weightlifting Federation, there is still the record of Nurcan Taylan (Turkey) of 121 kg who was disqualified for doping for this result. Here was the previous mark.
 On the website of the International Weightlifting Federation there is still the record of Hripsime Khurshudyan (Armenia) of 283 kg in total (160 in the clean & jerk), who was disqualified for doping for these results, but the International Federation did not change the record table.

Women (1993–1997)

Women (1988–1992)

See also
 List of Olympic records in weightlifting
 List of junior world records in Olympic weightlifting
 List of youth world records in Olympic weightlifting

References
General
 IWF World Records 20 October 2022 updated
Specific

External links
 International Weightlifting Federation

Weightlifting
World